Australian singer and songwriter Kylie Minogue signed a record deal with Mushroom Records in 1987, and released her debut album Kylie in 1988. The bubblegum pop record was the first collaboration with long-time partners Stock Aitken Waterman, who also wrote and produced her subsequent studio albums Enjoy Yourself (1989), Rhythm of Love (1990), and Let's Get to It (1991). During her years under Deconstruction Records, Minogue released the eponymous fifth album (1994), described as "a sophisticated, stylish dance record" by Digital Spy, where she collaborated with music producers Brothers in Rhythm. Impossible Princess (1997) saw the singer adopt a more "experimental" approach, with elements of trip hop and electronica, where she penned every track, and touches on themes of self-discovery and freedom of expression.

Returning to more dance-oriented music, Minogue signed to Parlophone in 1999 and released Light Years the following year. Fever (2001) contained disco elements, while Body Language (2003) references to songs from the 1980s and explores genres like R&B and hip hop. She worked with Stuart Price, Greg Kurstin and Calvin Harris during her tenth and eleventh album, X (2007) and Aphrodite (2010), which mostly continued her dance-pop style of music. Kiss Me Once (2014), released under her short-lived contract with Roc Nation, featured production and songwriting from Sia and Pharrell Williams. Her first Christmas release, Kylie Christmas (2016) contains sixteen holiday-themed tracks, was released in 2015. 

Minogue signed a new record deal with BMG Rights Management in 2017, and released her fourteenth studio album Golden the following year. She co-wrote every song on the album, which was heavily influenced by country and dance music. Disco (2020) was influenced by 1970s and 1980s disco music. Minogue co-wrote and engineered songs for Disco via her home studio during the COVID-19 pandemic lockdown.

Minogue has also recorded songs for a number of side projects. In 1988, she worked with Jason Donovan on the single "Especially for You" and the B-side "All I Wanna Do Is Make You Mine". She went on to record "Where the Wild Roses Grow" and "Death Is Not the End" for Nick Cave and the Bad Seeds' Murder Ballads (1996). She collaborated with American producer Fernando Garibay in two electronic-influenced extended plays Sleepwalker (2014) and Kylie + Garibay (2015). She has also contributed in various charity releases, including "Do They Know It's Christmas?" (1989), "Everybody Hurts" (2010) and "God Only Knows" (2014).

Songs

Notes

References

External links
Kylie Minogue songs at AllMusic

Lists of songs recorded by Australian artists
Lists of songs recorded by British artists